Karangasso-Vigué is a department or commune of Houet Province in south-western Burkina Faso. Its capital lies at the town of Karankasso-Vigue.

Towns and villages
Klesso

References

Departments of Burkina Faso
Houet Province